Katsa (also known as faray) is a rattle used in Malagasy music.

References 

Shaken idiophones or rattles
Malagasy culture
Malagasy words and phrases